CSCI may refer to:
Computer Science Course ID
Computer Software Configuration Item, designation of end use software product under MIL-STD-498 and DOD-STD-2167A
China State Construction International Holdings
Chartered Scientist (CSci), a professional qualification in the United Kingdom
Canadian Society for Clinical Investigation
 Commission for Social Care Inspection